Costa's Garden Odyssey  is an Australian television documentary series gardening program hosted by landscape architect Costa Georgiadis. Costa takes a holistic approach to gardening and horticulture, emphasising the importance of water and its management and the benefits of sustainable living. Costa spreads his green wisdom while communicating with people and celebrating cultures and community.

References

Television shows set in Sydney
2009 Australian television series debuts
2011 Australian television series endings
Australian community access television shows
Special Broadcasting Service original programming
Gardening television
Television series by Freehand Productions